Whitt is a surname.

Whitt  may also refer to:
Whitt Clement, American politician
 Whitt L. Moreland (1930–1951), a U.S. Marine posthumous recipient of the Medal of Honor for his sacrifice during the Korean War
 Whitt, Texas
Whitt elementary

See also

 Whit (disambiguation)